Senator Doherty may refer to:

John Doherty (New York politician) (1826–1859), New York State Senate
Michael J. Doherty (born 1963), New Jersey State Senate
Pearse Doherty (born 1977), Senate of Ireland

See also
Senator Dougherty (disambiguation)